Ron Phibun railway station is a railway station located in Ron Phibun Subdistrict, Ron Phibun District, Nakhon Si Thammarat.

Train services 
 Local No. 445/446 Chumphon-Hat Yai Junction-Chumphon
 Local No. 447/448 Surat Thani-Sungai Kolok-Surat Thani

References 
 
 

Railway stations in Thailand